Alabang–Zapote Road is a four-lane national road which travels east–west through the southern limits of Metro Manila, Philippines. It runs parallel to Dr. Santos Avenue in the north and is named for the two barangays that it links: Alabang in Muntinlupa and Zapote in Las Piñas.

Since 1997, it also extends further west for several hundred meters connecting Las Piñas to its present terminus at Coastal Road (R-1) in Bacoor, Cavite.

The road carries more than 70,000 vehicles per day as of 2016, and suffers from traffic jams. The Metropolitan Manila Development Authority (MMDA) listed Alabang–Zapote Road as a major traffic bottleneck point or choke point, and the Unified Vehicular Volume Reduction Program (UVVRP), or "color coding" scheme, is modified for the road to no longer include window hours.

The entire route is designated as National Route 411 (N411) of the Philippine highway network.

History
Alabang–Zapote Road follows an old Spanish coastal trail that linked the Province of Manila to La Laguna and other southern provinces. It was called Calle Real (Spanish for "royal street") or Camino Real (Spanish for "royal way") which spanned from Ermita to Muntinlupa. It was also designated as part of Highway 1 (especially during the American colonial era) and of Manila South Road, which spanned from Manila to Bicol Region. At present, only the road's section in Las Piñas and Muntinlupa is called Calle Real or Real Street as an alternative name for the road, while the rest of the route had been renamed to Del Pilar Street in Manila, Harrison Avenue in Pasay, Quirino Avenue in Parañaque, and Diego Cera Avenue in Las Piñas.

The road was extended to the northwest towards Coastal Road in Bacoor in 1997 with the construction of the four-lane Alabang-Zapote Centennial Flyover (now Zapote Flyover) that was built as a solution to the increasing traffic volume along the road. Its section in Alabang, Muntinlupa, particularly between Filinvest and Bridgeway Avenues, was also realigned between 2006 and 2012 with the development of Filinvest Corporate City.

Route description

The road begins at the junction of Manila South Road (National Highway), Montillano Street, East Service Road, and South Luzon Expressway's Alabang Exit in Alabang, Muntinlupa, below the Alabang Viaduct and Skyway Extension. A spur carrying southbound traffic also branches the highway to the front of Starmall Alabang at Manila South Road. It then crosses into Filinvest City and Barangays Cupang and Ayala Alabang. In Filinvest City, the road is interrupted due to realignment brought out by its development. The gap is filled by a segment of Bridgeway Avenue between West Service Road and Spectrum Midway before resuming as short frontage roads parallel to Skyway's South Station Exit.

West of Investment Drive (northern extension of Daang Hari Road) at Madrigal Business Park, it then enters Las Piñas and goes past the commercial and residential areas of the city. It then crosses Zapote River and enters the province of Cavite at Bacoor, where the road ends at an interchange with Coastal Road (CAVITEX). Electric power subtransmission lines by Meralco, placed on tall roadside posts, also shared by distribution lines, line almost the whole length of the road from Zapote in Las Piñas to Alabang in Muntinlupa and the proposed Las Piñas–Muntinlupa Expressway, which is worth .

Traffic

, the Las Piñas Traffic Management Office reported more than 70,000 vehicles travelling on Alabang–Zapote Road daily, that already reached above its allowable capacity. The road gained notoriety for its traffic jams, and it is listed by the Metro Manila Development Authority as a major traffic bottleneck area in south Metro Manila, along with other major roads leading to Ninoy Aquino International Airport, like Sucat Road, Andrews Avenue, and Domestic Road. The Unified Vehicular Volume Reduction Program (UVVRP), or the "coding" scheme, is modified for Alabang–Zapote Road to have no "window hours".

Intersections

Intersections in the list below are arranged by kilometer number, based on numbers on kilometer stones from Rizal Park in Manila, the Kilometer Zero.

Mainline

Spur

References

Streets in Metro Manila